Ținutul Mării was one of the ten ținuturi ("lands") of Romania, founded in 1938 after King Carol II initiated an institutional reform by modifying the 1923 Constitution and the law of territorial administration. It included parts of Wallachia, central Dobruja (the southern half of Northern Dobruja) and the entire Southern Dobruja. It was named after the Black Sea, and had its capital in the city of Constanța. Ținutul Mării ceased to exist following the territorial losses to the Kingdom of Bulgaria and the king's abdication in 1940.

Coat of arms
The coat of arms was party per bend sinister by a wavy bend sinister. The dexter consists of four bends, two of azure and two of or, representing the former four counties of the Greater Romania (71 in total), which it had included. The sinister is plain azure field. Over the shield there is an argent anchor, in reference to the littoral.

Former counties incorporated
After the 1938 Administrative and Constitutional Reform, the older 71 counties lost their authority. 
Caliacra County
Constanța County
Durostor County
Ialomița County

See also
 Historical administrative divisions of Romania
 Sud-Est (development region)
 History of Romania

External links
Map

Dobruja
Marii
Wallachia
1938 establishments in Romania
1940 disestablishments in Romania
States and territories established in 1938
States and territories disestablished in 1940